Aubinyà, also named Auvinyà (and Albinyà in the past), is a village in Andorra, in the parish of Sant Julià de Lòria.

Main sights
There is the Sant Romà d'Aubinyà Church in the township.

Populated places in Andorra
Sant Julià de Lòria